Bodboy is the second EP by American rapper Bobby Shmurda, released on August 5, 2022, by GS9 Records and ONErpm. The EP contains guest appearances by Fat Tony and Rowdy Rebel. It is Shmurda's first project since his release from prison in February 2021 and comes nearly eight years after his last release, Shmurda She Wrote (2014). The EP serves as a warm-up for Shmurda's upcoming debut studio album, Ready to Live, which is scheduled for release in 2023.

Singles and promotion
On July 15, 2022, the EP's debut single, "Hoochie Daddy", was released. On July 24, Shmurda announced the EP and its release date after sharing the music video for "Hoochie Daddy".

Track listing

References

2022 EPs
Hip hop EPs
Bobby Shmurda albums